Halkin Street is a street in Belgravia, London, running south-west to north-east from the north-east corner of Belgrave Square to Grosvenor Place.

Notable buildings include Forbes House, a Grade II-listed  detached mansion at No. 10, built in the early-mid 19th century.

The 5-star Halkin Hotel is at No. 5–6, and the Mexican Consulate is at No. 8. The street is also home to the Belgrave Chapel and the Caledonian Club.

Notable residents
Bernard Cornfeld (1927–1995), the international financier, lived at No. 1

References

Belgravia
Streets in the City of Westminster